In enzymology, a malonate CoA-transferase is an enzyme that catalyzes the chemical reaction

acetyl-CoA + malonate  acetate + malonyl-CoA

Thus, the two substrates of this enzyme are acetyl-CoA and malonate, whereas its two products are acetate and malonyl-CoA.

This enzyme belongs to the family of transferases, specifically the CoA-transferases.  The systematic name of this enzyme class is acetyl-CoA:malonate CoA-transferase. This enzyme is also called malonate coenzyme A-transferase.  This enzyme participates in beta-alanine metabolism and propanoate metabolism.

References 

 
 

EC 2.8.3
Enzymes of unknown structure